John Clarke is an Australian former professional rugby league footballer who played in the New South Wales Rugby League (NSWRL) competition during the 1930s and 1940s.

Playing career
Clarke played 9 seasons and 68 matches for the Eastern Suburbs club in the years (1932–36, 1938 and 1940–42) seasons. A forward, Clarke was a member of Eastern Suburbs side that defeated Canterbury-Bankstown in the 1940 premiership decider.

References

External links
 Statistics at rugbyleagueproject.org
 The Encyclopedia Of Rugby League; Alan Whiticker & Glen Hudson

Australian rugby league players
Sydney Roosters players
Rugby league second-rows
Rugby league hookers
Rugby league props
Possibly living people
Year of birth missing
Place of birth missing